Trębaczew  is a village in the administrative district of Gmina Działoszyn, within Pajęczno County, Łódź Voivodeship, in central Poland.

The village has a population of 2,387.

References

Villages in Pajęczno County